Lambs Farm is a non-profit organization near Libertyville, Illinois, that provides vocational and residential services for over 250 adults with developmental disabilities. Located on a  campus, Lambs Farm includes several family attractions, such as a petting zoo, a pet shop, a miniature golf course, several small amusement rides, a restaurant, a thrift shop, a country store and a bakery. Lambs Farm community members work at these attractions, or at a nearby vocational center.

Lambs Farm was formed in the 1960s by Corrine Owen and Robert Terese. Owen and Terese had been teaching at a school for adults with developmental disabilities, and were discouraged by the limited opportunities available to such people. In 1961, they opened a pet store near Chicago's Gold Coast and employed twelve of their students, who enthusiastically helped tend to the animals. Four years later, Owen and Therese acquired a farm near Libertyville with the help of W. Clement Stone and began developing the current Lambs Farm facility. By the late 1980s, Lambs Farm was hosting over 300,000 visitors a year, making it the third most popular attraction in Lake County, Illinois (behind Great America and the Ravinia Festival).

The farm takes its name from John 21:15, in which Jesus tells St. Peter, "Feed my lambs."

Notes

External links
Lambs Farm

Libertyville, Illinois
Disability organizations based in the United States
Buildings and structures in Lake County, Illinois
Tourist attractions in Lake County, Illinois